Ben A. Riehle (May 15, 1897November 27, 1967) was a member of the Wisconsin State Assembly.

Biography
Bunchard Anton Riehle was born on May 15, 1897, in Rietbrock, Wisconsin. During World War I, he served in the United States Army. He died on his farm in Athens, Wisconsin on November 27, 1967.

Political career
Riehle was a member of the state assembly from 1955 to 1968. Previously, he was a member of the Marathon County, Wisconsin board from 1941 to 1942, and was an unsuccessful candidate for the assembly in 1948.

References

People from Marathon County, Wisconsin
County supervisors in Wisconsin
Members of the Wisconsin State Assembly
Military personnel from Wisconsin
United States Army soldiers
United States Army personnel of World War I
1897 births
1967 deaths
20th-century American politicians
People from Athens, Wisconsin